Marco Battagli or Marcus de Battaglis (died 1370/76) was a historian from Rimini in North Eastern Italy. He wrote a universal chronicle in Latin.

References

1370s deaths
14th-century Italian historians
People from Rimini
Italian chroniclers
Year of birth unknown